Minister for Immigration and Integration is a Danish ministerial office. The office was created by Prime Minister Anders Fogh Rasmussen on 27 November 2001 when he formed the Cabinet of Anders Fogh Rasmussen I after the 2001 Danish parliamentary election, in which  refugees, immigration, and integration of people from non-western countries had been important issues.

One of the stated goals of the Anders Fogh cabinet, and especially the supporting Danish People's Party which secured the government's majority, was to "stem the flow" of refugees to Denmark, and new tougher rules did drastically reduce the number of refugees being granted asylum. Another initiative was the 24 year rule, which stated that spouses must be 24 or older before they could immigrate to Denmark through family reunification (there had been many cases of arranged marriages of young people being used to get around immigration restrictions).

It was abolished by the Cabinet of Helle Thorning-Schmidt after Rasmussen's right-wing alliance lost the 2011 election.

List of Ministers of Refugees, Immigration and Integration

External links
History of the Ministry. From its official homepage

References
Tørre tal om indvandrere og kriminalitet - from Danmarks Statistik.
Årbog om udlændinge i Danmark 2001 - From the Ministry of the Interior.

Refugees
Refugees
Society of Denmark
Government agencies established in 2001
Government agencies disestablished in 2011